Fantasy is Candy Lo's 5th studio album. It was released on 19 July 2001. For this album Candy Lo continued her collaboration with Hong Kong producer Kubert Leung with whom she also wrote and produced the tracks on her previous albums, such as MUSE.

Track listing
Title translations in brackets.

"刀槍不入" Dou1 Cheung1 Bat1 Yap6 (Rigid Way Of Thinking)
"生於和平區" Saang1 Yu1 Wo4 Ping4 Keui1 (Life In A Peaceful Place)
"無痛分手" Mou4 Tung3 Fan1 Sau2 (A Painless Break-Up)
"吶喊" Naap6 Haam3 (Call)
"一個人在途上" Yat1 Go3 Yan4 Joi6 Tou4 Seung5/6 (A Person On The Way Up)
"風鈴" Fung1 Ling4 (Wind Chimes)
"無題" Mou1 Tai4 (Untitled)
"Hello吉蒂" Gat1 Dai3 (Kitty/Lucky Peduncle)
"女吸血鬼的情歌" Neui5 Kap1 Hyut3 Gwai2 Dik1 Ching4 Go1 (Female Vampire's Love Song)
"半本通書" Bun3 Bun2 Tung1 Syu1 (Half Book Calendar)
"去你的婚禮" Heui3 Nei5 Dik1 Fan1 Lai5 (Go To Your Wedding)

Candy Lo albums
2001 albums